Jeanne de la Font (1500–1532) was a poet and patron of the French Renaissance.

Life and work
Jeanne was the only child of Jean de la Font and Françoise Godard of Bourges. Marguerite de Navarre arranged her marriage to her secretary Jacques Thiboust. They lived in the city of Bourges, which had become a cultural centre because of the patronage of Jeanne of France at the start of the century. Marguerite attracted many humanists to the city and both Jeanne de la Font and her husband established friendly ties to them. The couple had five children, of whom Jacqueline, Jeanne and Marie Thiboust survived to adulthood and became known for their learning.

Jeanne wrote a French adaption of Giovanni Boccaccio's Teseida, which gained her praise as a poet.

Notes

References
 

16th-century French women writers
16th-century French writers
1500 births
1532 deaths
French women poets